William Alexander Graham Jr. (December 26, 1839 – December 23, 1923) was a North Carolina legislator and state Commissioner of Agriculture.

Biography
Graham was born on December 26, 1839 in Hillsborough, North Carolina, to William Alexander Graham (1804–1875) and Susannah Sarah Washington. Graham was educated at private schools, the University of North Carolina at Chapel Hill, and Princeton College. He served as an officer in the Confederate Army during the Civil War. Graham became a farmer and led the North Carolina Farmers' Alliance. A Democrat, he was elected to represent Lincoln County in the North Carolina Senate in 1874 and 1879 and in the North Carolina House of Representatives in 1905. In 1879 to 1880, Graham served as President pro tempore of the North Carolina Senate. From 1899 to 1908, Graham was a member of the state Board of Agriculture.

In 1908, Graham was elected Commissioner of Agriculture. He was re-elected several times and served until his death in December 1923. His son, William Graham Jr., succeeded him as Commissioner.

Graham died in Raleigh, North Carolina, on December 23, 1923, just days before his 84th birthday and is buried in Machpelah Presbyterian Church Cemetery, Lincolnton, North Carolina.

The William A. Graham Jr. Farm was listed on the National Register of Historic Places in 1977.

References

External links
NCpedia
North Carolina Manual of 1913
Political Graveyard: Graham family

1839 births
1923 deaths
People from Hillsborough, North Carolina
North Carolina Commissioners of Agriculture
Democratic Party North Carolina state senators
Democratic Party members of the North Carolina House of Representatives
People of North Carolina in the American Civil War
Confederate States Army officers